Patience is the fifth and final studio album by the English singer-songwriter George Michael, released on 15 March 2004. The much delayed follow-up to Older, at the time of its release it was considered Michael's comeback album since it was his first album composed of original material since 1996, and his first for Sony Music since 1990's Listen Without Prejudice Vol. 1.

Patience spawned six singles. The first two, "Freeek!" and "Shoot the Dog", were already released in 2002 by Polydor, when the album was originally due.

In a 2004 interview with Adam Mattera for UK magazine Attitude, Michael explained how he felt reenergised and excited about the project: "There's something about the vocals on this album that’s a lot more confident, more certain. There are proclamations of love that I’ve never made before – certainly since Wham! – and then there’s going further into the truth at the same time, like on "My Mother Had A Brother" or "Through" – they're trying to get closer to the truth."

Return to Sony 
On 17 November 2003, Michael re-signed with Sony Music, the company he had left after a legal battle in which Michael claimed that his contract was stifling him and was keeping him in "professional slavery". As a result, his contract was sold by Sony to rival record companies Virgin Records and DreamWorks Records on 14 July 1995.

Release and reception 
Patience went on sale in most of the world in late March 2004 and debuted at number one on the UK Albums Chart, and at number 2 in Australia on 22 March. It became one of the fastest-selling albums in the UK, selling over 275,000 copies in the first week. The album went on sale in the US on 18 May 2004; however, it did not contain "Patience Pt. 2" and "Shoot the Dog". It debuted in the US at number 29 but after TV appearances, such as The Oprah Winfrey Show, the following week, it reached its chart peak of number 12. As of 2006, the album had sold 381,000 in the United States. It has sold around four million copies worldwide.

The first single "Freeek!" had already reached number one in Italy, Spain and Denmark in March 2002 and reached the top ten in the UK and top five in Australia. The album features a remixed version called "Freeek! '04".

The second single, "Shoot the Dog", was released in July 2002. It was not released as a single in Canada or the US over sensitivity to the 11 September 2001 attacks, and was not included on the Patience album in those countries. While it reached the top five in Spain, Italy and Denmark, it failed to reach the top ten in the UK.

The third single from Patience, "Amazing", was released in March 2004 and went to number one in Italy and Spain, also reaching number 4 in the UK and number 6 in Australia.

The fourth single, "Flawless (Go to the City)", was released in June 2004 and reached number 8 on the UK Singles Chart. It reached number one on Billboards Hot Dance Club Songs chart.

In November 2004, Sony released a fifth single from Patience, "Round Here". The single reached number 32 on the UK charts.

"John and Elvis Are Dead", the sixth single was released in October 2005 and only sold through the Internet as a download.

Anti-war song 
The album contains the anti-war song "Shoot the Dog". When released in July 2002, "Shoot the Dog" had already proved to be controversial. It was highly critical of George W. Bush and Tony Blair in the leadup to the 2003 invasion of Iraq. The video showed a cartoon version of Michael astride a nuclear missile in the Middle East and Tony and Cherie Blair in bed with President Bush. The latter image was apparently intended as a homage to the 1986 video for "Land of Confusion" by Genesis. The cartoon was produced by the makers of 2DTV, a satirical animated television show broadcast weekly on the independent television station ITV in the UK.

In an interview with MTV, Michael said the song was primarily intended to highlight what he saw as a lack of consultation by Tony Blair about the decision of invading Iraq. "People are looking at the song in context of an attack on America, as opposed to an attack on Tony Blair. And really, my attack is that Tony Blair is not involving the British in this issue. He's perfectly happy staying up to watch the World Cup and enjoying the Jubilee, all things I'm perfectly guilty of, but there's a serious discussion about Iraq, which hasn't taken place. We don't know what Saddam Hussein is capable of, the British public has no idea."

Final album 
Michael announced Patience would be his last album on sale to the public as a physical release. He told BBC Radio 1 on 10 March 2004 that music he put out in the future would be available for download with fans encouraged to make a donation to charity. He said: "I've been very well remunerated for my talents over the years so I really don't need the public's money. I'd like to have something on the Internet which is a charitable download site where anyone can download my music for free. I'll have my favourite charities up there and people will hopefully donate to that." He stated that the decision would put less pressure to produce a new album every so often and allow him to have more of a private life.

Patience was Michael's final studio album of original material before his death on 25 December 2016.

Track listing 

Notes
 signifies an additional producer.
 signifies original music producer.
An alternative version of "Please Send Me Someone", the B-side to "Flawless (Go to the City)", appears only on Japanese pressings of the album.
Had the 30 seconds of silence on "Through" not be included, the duration of the song would be 4:52.

Sample credits
"Shoot the Dog" samples "Love Action (I Believe in Love)" by The Human League, written by Philip Oakey and Ian Burden.
"Flawless (Go to the City)" contains elements from "Flawless" by The Ones, written by Paul Alexander, Olivier Stumm, Nashom Wooden, Eric Matthew, and Gary Turnier.
"Please Send Me Someone (Anselmo's Song)" contains elements from "Moonraker" written and composed by John Barry and Hal David.
"Freeek! '04" contains samples from "Try Again" by Aaliyah, written by Tim Mosley and Stephen Garrett; "Breathe and Stop" by Q-Tip, written by James Yancey and Kamaal Fareed; and "N.T." by Kool & the Gang, written by Gene Redd, Clarence Redd, Roy Handy, Cleveland Horne, Ronald Bell, Robert Mickens, Dennis Thomas, Richard Westfield, George Brown, and Claydes Smith.

Personnel 
Credits adapted from AllMusic.

 Eugene Adebari – photography
 David Arnold – orchestration
 David Austin – keyboards, programming
 Joanna Bailey – direction
 Michael Brown – guitar
 Jo Bryant – background vocals
 Joel Bryant – background vocals
 Chris Cameron – piano
 Tony Cousins – mastering
 Tom Coyne – mastering
 Ruadhri Cushnan – arranger, keyboards, producer, programming
 Andy Davies – assistant engineer
 James Dimmock – photography
 Jon Douglas – programming, keyboards, producer
 Niall Flynn – arranger, audio engineer, engineer, producer
 Dan Gautreau – programming
 Pete Gleadall – additional keyboards, programming
 James Jackman – arranger, programming, keyboards, main personnel, photography, producer
 Greg Jakobek – design
 Abid Katib – photography
 George Michael – arranger, audio production, bass guitar, design, programming, guitar, keyboards, piano, primary artist, producer, lead vocals
 Adam Noble – assistant engineer
 Phil Palmer – guitar
 Jack Panayiotou – photography
 Graham Silbiger – bass guitar
 Luke Smith – piano,wurly,rhodes 
 Ben Smithard – photography
 Ellen von Unwerth – photography

Charts

Weekly charts

Monthly charts

Year-end charts

Certifications and sales

References

External links 
 

2004 albums
George Michael albums
Epic Records albums